S. Morris Engel (born 1931) is an author, philosopher, and linguist. He received his PhD from the University of Toronto in 1959, writing on "The philosophy of language in Hobbes and Locke". He was a professor of philosophy at the University of Southern California and York University.

Published works
Analyzing Informal Fallacies
Fallacies and Pitfalls of Language: The Language Trap
Language and Illumination: Studies in the History of Philosophy
The Chain of Logic
The Language Trap: Or, How to Defend Yourself Against the Tyranny of Words
The Problem of Tragedy
The Study of Philosophy
With Good Reason: An Introduction to Informal Fallacies
Wittgenstein's Doctrine of the Tyranny of Language: An Historical and Critical Examination of His Blue Book

Engel also translated "Cat in the Ghetto: Stories" by Rachmil Bryks from Yiddish to English.

Notes

Living people
1931 births
Philosophers of language
University of Toronto alumni
University of Southern California faculty
Academic staff of York University